During World War II, the United States Army Air Forces (USAAF) established numerous airfields in California for training pilots and aircrews of USAAF fighters and bombers.

Most of these airfields were under the command of Fourth Air Force or the Army Air Forces Training Command (AAFTC). However, Air Technical Service Command (ATSC), Air Transport Command (ATC) and I Troop Carrier Command used a significant number of airfields in a support role. A significant number of them had operational squadrons for air defense of the Pacific coastline and anti-submarine patrols, and one was even handed over to Civil Air Patrol pilots for their use.

In addition to the major fields, dozens of minor auxiliary fields and airstrips were built, generally to provide more room for basic flight training, but also to support other operations. A few of these were designed as "fallback fields" for launching defensive operations in case of a Japanese invasion.

Most Army airfields were built with three runways in a triangle, with parking ramp areas adjacent to one runway. This triangular configuration allowed rapid construction, without regard to the direction of the prevailing winds. Navy fields were generally built with two runways in a cross, with a third runway intersecting the other two at an angle.

There were, of course, other designs, including single-runway fields.  Most noteworthy were "landing mats," large concrete squares, hexagons and circles, which allowed takeoffs and landings in any direction.

Following the war, many bases and auxiliary fields were given to local governments or returned to service as municipal airports. Often, budget constraints caused the new owners to close or even remove the "extra" runways, retaining only those that faced into the prevailing winds. In at least one case (Orland), large portions of a landing mat were removed, leaving a conventional runway and ramp.

Several fields were retained as United States Air Force installations and were front-line bases during the Cold War, or used for experimental aviation, the most notable of these being Edwards Air Force Base.

A few were sold or given back to private owners, generally to be returned to agricultural use, while a handful have become private airports. A number of fields were simply abandoned, due to their remote locations, and the remains of these can still be found, especially in the Mojave Desert.

Major airfields

Fourth Air Force
The mission of Fourth Air Force was the air defense of the West Coast, operating two air defense wings in California (Los Angeles and San Francisco). It also provided operational training of newly formed groups and squadrons in combat aircraft prior to their deployment to overseas combat theaters. After April 1944, operational training was changed to replacement training of newly commissioned pilots in combat fighters from the AAF Training Command advanced flying schools.

 Briefly used in 1941 While Hammer Army Airfield under construction
 Now: Fresno Chandler Executive Airport 

 Army Air Forces Basic Flying School / Army Air Force Pilot School, Basic, 24 March 1942–25 April 1944
 10th Base Headquarters an Air Base Squadron, 12 July 1942–25 April 1944
 433rd Army Air Force Base Unit (Combat Crew Training Station, Fighter), 25 April 1944–31 October 1945
 Now: Chico Municipal Airport
 Known sub-bases and auxiliaries
 Orland Auxiliary Field 
 Kirkwood Auxiliary Field
 Vina Auxiliary Field
 Campbell Auxiliary Field
 Oroville Auxiliary Field
 Sacramento Municipal Airport
 Oroville Army Airfield
 Siskiyou County Army Airfield
 Redding Army Airfield

 Daggett Municipal Airport, Daggett
 Now: Barstow-Daggett Airport 

 Hamilton Army Airfield, Novato, north of San Rafael
 Air Base Squadron, 45th Air Base Group / 46th Air Base Squadron/ 46th Base Headquarters and Air Base Squadron, 25 August 1940–1 April 1944
 460th Army Air Force Base Unit (Base Services, Air Transport Command), 1 April 1944–8 May 1946
 Hq, West Coast Wing, Air Transport Command, 1 August 1944–4 December 1945
 Was: Hamilton Air Force Base (1947–1976)
 Now: Part of the Hamilton Wetland Restoration Project
 Known sub-bases and auxiliaries
 Montague Air Force Auxiliary Field
 Napa Army Airfield
 Willows Municipal Airport
 Redding Army Airfield
 Siskiyou County Army Airfield

 Joint Use with United States Navy (NATS)
 50th Air Base Squadron / 50th Base Headquarters and Air Base Squadron, 2 August 1941–31 March 1944
 450th Army Air Force Base Unit (Combat Crew Training Station, Night Fighter), 1 April 1944–15 March 1946
 Now:  Fresno Air National Guard Base 
 Known sub-bases and auxiliaries
 Salinas Army Air Base 
 Delano Army Airfield 
 Meadows Field 
 Visalia Army Airfield 
 Hayward Army Airfield

 Air Corps Basic Flying School / AAF Basic Flying School / AAF Pilot School, Basic; 30 November 1941–1 June 1944
 88th Air Base Squadron / 88th Base Headquarters and Air Base Squadron; 12 December 1941–30 April 1944
 3023rd Army Air Force Base Unit (Pilot School, Basic); 1 May 1944–1 June 1944
 461st Army Air Force Base Unit (Processing In); 1 June 1944–10 November 1945
 Now: non-flying agricultural use.
 Known sub-bases and auxiliaries
 Boston Field
 Huron Field
 Indian Field
 Murray Field
 West Field
 Summit Lake Field (Now NAS Lemoore)
 Helm Field
 Corcoran Municipal Airport
 Porterville Army Airfield
 Coalinga Municipal Airport (Old)

 Base Headquarters and 4th Air Base Squadron; 1 September 1936–1 September 1940
 4th Air Base Group; 1 September 1940–15 January 1941
 Air Base Squadron, 32nd Air Base Group / 31st Air Base Squadron / 31st Base Headquarters and Air Base Squadron; 15 January 1941–31 March 1944
 420th Army Air Force Base Unit (Combat Crew Training Station, Heavy Bombardment); 1 April 1944–31 March 1946
 Was: March Air Force Base (1947–1993)
 Now:  March Air Reserve Base
 Known sub-bases and auxiliaries
 Buffalo Springs Airport 
 Needles Army Airfield 
 Shavers Summit Army Airfield

 Now: Yuba County Airport 

 323rd Air Base Sq / 323rd Base Headquarters and Air Base Sq; 1 May 1942–31 March 1944
 421st Army Air Force Base Unit  (Combat Crew Training Station, Heavy Bombardment); 1 April 1944–16 October 1945
 Now:  Edwards Air Force Base
 Known sub-bases and auxiliaries
 Bishop Army Airfield
 Blythe Army Airfield
 Palmdale Army Airfield
 Desert Center Army Airfield
 Gary Army Airfield 
 Rice Army Airfield
 Muroc Flight Test Base

 311th Army Air Force Base Unit
 Now: LA/Ontario International Airport 

 301st Base Headquarters and Air Base Squadron
 Also used by Air Transport Command
 Now: Salinas Municipal Airport 
 Known sub-bases and auxiliaries
 Half Moon Bay Flight Strip

 Santa Maria Army Airfield, Santa Maria
 483d Army Air Force Base Unit
 Now: Santa Maria Public Airport 
 Known sub-bases and auxiliaries
 Estrella Army Airfield

 493d Army Air Force Base Unit
 Now: Charles M. Schulz - Sonoma County Airport

 Joint Use with United States Navy
 VI Air Support Command (AGF)
 475th Army Air Force Base Unit
 Now: Jacqueline Cochran Regional Airport

 Van Nuys Army Airfield, Van Nuys
 505th Army Air Force Base Unit
 Was: Van Nuys Air National Guard Base (1946–1990)
 Now: Van Nuys Airport 
 Known sub-bases and auxiliaries
 Grand Central Air Terminal 
 Oxnard Flight Strip
 Was: Oxnard Air Force Base (1951–1970)
 Now: Camarillo Airport

AAF Training Command
Training Command airfields in California provided Primary, Basic and Advanced (both single and multi-engine) pilot training under the Army Air Force Flying Training Command. Mather AAF provided Navigator Training. Training Command also provided technical aircraft support training to both enlisted and officer personnel at aircraft delivery fields, operated by manufacturers such as North American, Douglas, Northrup, Lockheed and Consolidated Aircraft. Santa Ana AAB provided basic indoctrination training to new enlisted personnel and also pilot qualification screening for prospective air cadets.

 63d Army Air Force Base Unit
 Now: Agricultural Use
 Known sub-bases and auxiliaries
 Parker Auxiliary Airfield
 Kern Field Auxiliary Airfield
 Allen Auxiliary Airfield
 Conners Auxiliary Airfield
 Taft Auxiliary Airfield
 Cuyama Auxiliary Airfield

 67th Army Air Force Base Unit
 Also used by: Air Transport Command
 Was: Mather Air Force Base (1947–1993)
 Now: Sacramento Mather Airport
 Known sub-bases and auxiliaries
 Concord Army Airfield
 Franklin Auxiliary Airfield 
 Lincoln Auxiliary Airfield
 Winter-Davis Flight Strip 
 Elk Grove Auxiliary Airfield

 87th Army Air Force Base Unit
 Was: George Air Force Base (1947–1992)
 Now: Southern California Logistics Airport 
 Known sub-bases and auxiliaries
 Hawes Auxiliary Airfield
 Helendale Auxiliary Airfield
 Mirage Auxiliary Airfield
 Grey Butte Auxiliary Airfield

 414th Army Air Force Base Unit
 Known sub-bases and auxiliaries
 Orange County Army Airfield
 Now: John Wayne Airport

 64th Army Air Force Base Unit
 Now: Shafter-Minter Field Airport
 Known sub-bases and auxiliaries
 Wasco Auxiliary Airfield 
 Pond Auxiliary Field
 Famoso Auxiliary Airfield
 Dunlap Auxiliary Airfield
 Semi-tropic Auxiliary Airfield
 Poso Auxiliary Airfield
 Lost Hills Auxiliary Airfield
 Coalinga Municipal Airport (Old)

 60th Army Air Force Base Unit
 Also used by: Air Transport Command
 Now: Stockton Metropolitan Airport
 Known sub-bases and auxiliaries
 Kingsbury Auxiliary Airfield
 New Jerusalem Auxiliary Airfield
 Modesto Auxiliary Airfield
 Tracy Auxiliary Airfield
 Franklin Auxiliary Airfield

 HQ Continental Air Forces
 90th Army Air Force Base Unit
 Was: Castle Air Force Base (1947–1995)
 Now: Castle Airport 
 Known sub-bases and auxiliaries
 Merced Municipal Airport Auxiliary Field
 Ballico Auxiliary Field
 Howard Auxiliary Field
 Athlone Auxiliary Field
 Potter Auxiliary Field
 Merced New Municipal Airport Auxiliary Field
 Mariposa Auxiliary Field

AAF contract flying schools
Private flying schools operated under contract by Flying Training Command, providing primary pilot training to new air cadets. Although training was provided by civilian contractors and instruction was provided by civilian instructors, the schools were commanded by military personnel and were operated as a military base. These schools operated from early 1942 until being phased out in mid-1944. Graduates then advanced to regular Training Command flight schools for Basic and Advanced training.

 
 Operated by: Coast Aviation Corporation
 Known sub-bases and auxiliaries
 Hammond Auxiliary Field
 Vail Auxiliary Field
 Dos Palos Emergency Field
 Canal Field Auxiliary Field
 Mason Auxiliary Field

 Operated by: Morton Air Academy
 Now: W R Byron Airport (Private) 
 Known sub-bases and auxiliaries
 Ripley Auxiliary Field#1
 Ripley Auxiliary Field#2

 Operated by: Allen Hancock College of Aeronautics
 Now: Closed about 1959, now Allan Hancock College
 Known sub-bases and auxiliaries
 Santa Maria Auxiliary Field
 La Brea Auxiliary Field
 Mckinnon Auxiliary Field
 Souza Auxiliary Field
 Waller-Franklin Auxiliary Field

 
 Operated by: Undetermined
 Known sub-bases and auxiliaries
 Adamson Landing Field
 Independence Auxiliary Field
 Inyo County Auxiliary Field

 Operated by: Undetermined
 Now: Mesa Del Rey Airport 
 Known sub-bases and auxiliaries
 Benard Auxiliary Field
 Hanson Auxiliary Field
 Sorenson Auxiliary Field
 Trescony Auxiliary Field

 Operated by: Undetermined
 Now: San Luis Obispo County Regional Airport 

 Operated by: Rankin Aeronauticial Academy, Inc.
 Now: Agricultural use
 Known sub-bases and auxiliaries
 Hunter Auxiliary Field
 Tipton Auxiliary Field
 Strathmore Auxiliary Field
 Tulare Airport
 Trauger Auxiliary Field

 Ryan Field,   southest of Hemet
 Operated by: Ryan School of Aeronautics
 Now: Hemet-Ryan Airport 
 Known sub-bases and auxiliaries
 Banning Auxiliary Field
 Highland Auxiliary Field
 Ryan Auxiliary Field#1
 Ryan Auxiliary Field#2
 Ryan Auxiliary Field#3
 Valle Vista Auxiliary Field
 Gibbs Auxiliary Field

  
 Operated by: Visalia-Dinuba School of Aeronautics
 Known sub-bases and auxiliaries
 Three Rivers Auxiliary Field

 Operated by: Mira Loma Flight Academy
 Also used by United States Navy as a NAAS to NAS San Diego
 Now: Oxnard Airport,

 Operated by: Polaris Flight Academy 
 Now: Detention Facility
 Known sub-bases and auxiliaries
 Liberty Auxiliary Field
 Victory Field Auxiliary Field

Air Transport Command
Airfields were used for transport of personnel, supplies and equipment. Also for ferrying replacement aircraft to overseas units (Primarily Pacific Theater and Alaska).

 Station #10, Air Transport Command, Pacific Wing
 1504th Army Air Forces Base Unit
 Now:  Travis Air Force Base 

 20th Ferrying Group
 507th Army Air Force Base Unit
 Now: Oakland International Airport 

 Emergency landing field for Reno Army Air Base, Nevada (ATC)
 Later: Amedee Army Airfield 

 21st Ferrying Group
 459th Army Air Force Base Unit
 Also used by the United States Navy (Ferrying Service)
 Now: Palm Springs International Airport 

 Port of Embarkation
 San Francisco Fighter Wing (4th Air Force)
 Now: San Francisco International Airport 
 Also:  Coast Guard Air Station San Francisco

Technical Service Command
Provided aircraft modification prior to overseas deployment and also depot-level repair and maintenance services. Technical Service Command also operated acceptance centers for newly manufactured aircraft in Southern California, then ATC Ferrying Command transferred the new aircraft to various airfields or modification centers prior to deployment to operational units.

 4895th Army Air Force Base Unit
 Sacramento Air Depot
 Was: McClellan Air Force Base (1947–2001)
 Now: McClellan Airfield 
 Also:  Coast Guard Air Station Sacramento 
 Winter-Davis Flight Strip
 Redding Army Airfield

 499th Army Air Force Base Unit
 San Bernardino Air Depot
 Was: Norton Air Force Base (1947–1994)
 Now: San Bernardino International Airport 
 Known sub-bases and auxiliaries
 Desert Center Army Airfield
 Rice Army Airfield
 Gibbs Auxiliary Field
 Peik Auxiliary Field

 Delivery airport for Douglas Aircraft (A-20, B-18, C-47)
 Delivery airport for Vultee Aircraft (BT-13)
 Now: Santa Monica Airport 

 Joint Use: United States Navy
 Delivery airport for Northrop Aircraft (P-61)
 Also used by Technical Training Command
 Now: Jack Northrop Field/Hawthorne Municipal Airport 

 
 Lindbergh Field (San Diego Municipal Airport),   northof San Diego.
 Delivery airport for Consolidated Aircraft (PBY, B-24)
 Now: San Diego International Airport 
 Also:  Coast Guard Air Station San Diego
 Known sub-bases and auxiliaries
 Gibbs Auxiliary Field
 Peik Auxiliary Field

 Delivery airport for Lockheed Aircraft (P-38, B-17, PV-2, C-69)
 Also used by Technical Training Command
 Now: Bob Hope Airport 

 6th Ferrying Group (Air Transport Command)
 Delivery airport for Douglas Aircraft (B-17, A-26, C-47)
 348th Army Air Force Base Unit
 Now: Long Beach Airport 

 Now: Zamperini Field 

 Delivery airport for North American Aviation (AT-6, P-51, B-25)
 Delivery airport for Douglas Aircraft (SBD Dauntless)
 Aerial Port of Embarkation (Air Transport Command)
 Los Angeles Fighter Wing (4th Air Force)
 Also used by Technical Training Command
 Now: Los Angeles International Airport 
 Also:  Coast Guard Air Station Los Angeles

 Delivery airfield for Douglas Aircraft (C-54)
 Now: Santa Monica Municipal Airport

Known secondary facilities 

Desert Training Center

Desert Training Center's California Army Airfields built to support General Patton's many desert training camps. Patton's HQ was at Camp Young.
 Major airfields
 Blythe Army Air Base
 Desert Center Army Airfield
 Thermal Army Airfield
 Rice Army Airfield
 Shavers Summit Army Airfield (now Chiriaco Summit Airport)
 Minor airfields
 Camp Coxcomb Army Field (abandoned) 
 Camp Essex Army Field (abandoned) 
 Camp Goffs Army Field (abandoned) 
 Camp Ibis Army Field (abandoned)  
 Camp Iron Mountain Army Field

See also
 Air Transport Command (World War II)
 California during World War II
 List of airports in the Los Angeles area

References

 Maurer, Maurer (1983). Air Force Combat Units Of World War II. Maxwell AFB, Alabama: Office of Air Force History. .
 Ravenstein, Charles A. (1984). Air Force Combat Wings Lineage and Honors Histories 1947–1977. Maxwell AFB, Alabama: Office of Air Force History. .
 Thole, Lou (1999), Forgotten Fields of America : World War II Bases and Training, Then and Now. Vol. 2. Pictorial Histories Pub. 
 Military Airfields in World War II – California
  

 
World War II Army Airfields
World War II Army Airfields
World War II Army Airfields